Flappers were a subculture of young  Western women in the 1920s who wore short skirts (knee height was considered short during that period), bobbed their hair, listened to jazz, and flaunted their disdain for what was then considered acceptable behavior. Flappers were seen as brash for wearing excessive makeup, drinking alcohol, smoking cigarettes in public, driving automobiles, treating sex in a casual manner, and otherwise flouting social and sexual norms. As automobiles became available, flappers gained freedom of movement and privacy. 

Flappers are icons of the Roaring Twenties, the social, political turbulence, and increased transatlantic cultural exchange that followed the end of World War I, as well as the export of American jazz culture to Europe. There was a reaction to this counterculture from more conservative people, who belonged mostly to older generations. They claimed that the flappers' dresses were 'near nakedness', and that flappers were 'flippant', 'reckless', and unintelligent.

While primarily associated with the United States, the "modern girl" archetype was a worldwide phenomenon that had other names depending on the country, such as joven moderna in Argentina or garçonne in France, although the American term "flapper" was the most widespread internationally.

Etymology 
The slang term "flapper" may derive from an earlier use in northern England to mean "teenage girl", referring to one whose hair is not yet put up and whose plaited pigtail "flapped" on her back, or from an older word meaning "prostitute". The slang word "flap" was used for a young prostitute as early as 1631. By the 1890s, the word "flapper" was used in some localities as slang both for a very young prostitute, and, in a more general and less derogatory sense, of any lively mid-teenage girl.

The standard non-slang usage appeared in print as early as 1903 in England and 1904 in the United States, when novelist Desmond Coke used it in his college story of Oxford life, Sandford of Merton: "There's a stunning flapper". In 1907, English actor George Graves explained it to Americans as theatrical slang for acrobatic young female stage performers. The flapper was also known as a dancer, who danced like a bird—flapping her arms while doing the Charleston move. This move became quite a competitive dance during this era.

By 1908, newspapers as serious as The Times used the term, although with careful explanation: "A 'flapper', we may explain, is a young lady who has not yet been promoted to long frocks and the wearing of her hair 'up'". In April 1908, the fashion section of London's The Globe and Traveller contained a sketch entitled "The Dress of the Young Girl" with the following explanation: Americans, and those fortunate English folk whose money and status permit them to go in freely for slang terms ... call the subject of these lines the 'flapper.' The appropriateness of this term does not move me to such whole-hearted admiration of the amazing powers of enriching our language which the Americans modestly acknowledge they possess ..., [and] in fact, would scarcely merit the honour of a moment of my attention, but for the fact that I seek in vain for any other expression that is understood to signify that important young person, the maiden of some sixteen years. The sketch is of a girl in a frock with a long skirt, "which has the waistline quite high and semi-Empire, ... quite untrimmed, its plainness being relieved by a sash knotted carelessly around the skirt."

By November 1910, the word was popular enough for A. E. James to begin a series of stories in the London Magazine featuring the misadventures of a pretty fifteen-year-old girl and titled "Her Majesty the Flapper". By 1911, a newspaper review indicates the mischievous and flirtatious "flapper" was an established stage-type.

By 1912, the London theatrical impresario John Tiller, defining the word in an interview he gave to The New York Times, described a "flapper" as belonging to a slightly older age group, a girl who has "just come out". Tiller's use of the phrase "come out" means "to make a formal entry into 'society' on reaching womanhood". In polite society at the time, a teenage girl who had not come out would still be classed as a child. She would be expected to keep a low profile on social occasions and ought not to be the object of male attention. Although the word was still largely understood as referring to high-spirited teenagers, gradually in Britain it was being extended to describe any impetuous immature woman. By late 1914, the British magazine Vanity Fair was reporting that the Flapper was beginning to disappear in England, being replaced by the so-called "Little Creatures."

A Times article on the problem of finding jobs for women made unemployed by the return of the male workforce, following the end of World War One, was titled "The Flapper's Future". Under this influence, the meaning of the term changed somewhat, to apply to "independent, pleasure-seeking, khaki-crazy young women".

In his lecture in February 1920 on Britain's surplus of young women caused by the loss of young men in war, Dr. R. Murray-Leslie criticized "the social butterfly type... the frivolous, scantily-clad, jazzing flapper, irresponsible and undisciplined, to whom a dance, a new hat, or a man with a car, were of more importance than the fate of nations". In May of that year, Selznick Pictures released The Flapper, a silent comedy film starring Olive Thomas. It was the first film in the United States to portray the "flapper" lifestyle. By that time, the term had taken on the full meaning of the flapper generation style and attitudes

The use of the term coincided with a fashion among teenage girls in the United States in the early 1920s for wearing unbuckled galoshes, and a widespread false etymology held that they were called "flappers" because they flapped when they walked, as they wore their overshoes or galoshes unfastened, showing that they defied convention in a manner similar to the 21st century fad for untied shoelaces. Another suggestion to the origin of the term, in relation to fashion, comes from a 1920s fashion trend in which young women left their overcoat unbuttoned to allow it to flap back and forth as they walked, appearing more independent and freed from the tight, Victorian Era style clothing.

By the mid-1930s in Britain, although still occasionally used, the word "flapper" had become associated with the past. In 1936, a Times journalist grouped it with terms such as "blotto" as outdated slang: "[blotto] evokes a distant echo of glad rags and flappers ... It recalls a past which is not yet 'period'."

Influences

One cause of the change in young women's behavior was World War I, which ended in November 1918. The death of large numbers of young men in the war, and the Spanish flu pandemic which struck in 1918 killing between 20–40 million people, inspired in young people a feeling that life is short and could end at any moment. Therefore, young women wanted to spend their youth enjoying their life and freedom rather than just staying at home and waiting for a man to marry them.

Political changes were another cause of the flapper culture. World War I reduced the grip of the class system on both sides of the Atlantic, encouraging different classes to mingle and share their sense of freedom. Women finally won the right to vote in the United States on August 26, 1920. Women wanted to be men's social equals and were faced with the difficult realization of the larger goals of feminism: individuality, full political participation, economic independence, and 'sex rights'. They wanted to have freedoms like men and go smoking and drinking. In addition, many women had more opportunities in the workplace and had even taken traditionally male jobs such as doctors, lawyers, engineers and pilots. The rise of consumerism also promoted the ideals of "fulfilment and freedom", which encouraged women to think independently about their garments, careers, social activities.

Society changed quickly after World War I. For example, customs, technology, and manufacturing all moved quickly into the 20th century after the interruption of the war. The rise of the automobile was an important factor in flapper culture, as cars meant a woman could come and go as she pleased, travel to speakeasies and other entertainment venues, and use the large vehicles of the day for heavy petting or even sex. Also, the economic boom allowed more people the time and money to play golf and tennis and to take vacations, which required clothing adapted to these activities; the flapper's slender silhouette was very suitable for movement.

Evolution of the image 

The first appearance of the flapper style in the United States came from the popular 1920 Frances Marion film The Flapper, starring Olive Thomas. Thomas starred in a similar role in 1917, though it was not until The Flapper that the term was used. In her final movies, she was seen as the flapper image. Other actresses, such as Clara Bow, Louise Brooks, Colleen Moore and Joan Crawford would soon build their careers on the same image, achieving great popularity.

In the United States, popular contempt for Prohibition was a factor in the rise of the flapper. With legal saloons and cabarets closed, back alley speakeasies became prolific and popular. This discrepancy between the law-abiding, religion-based temperance movement and the actual ubiquitous consumption of alcohol led to widespread disdain for authority. Flapper independence was also a response to the Gibson girls of the 1890s. Although that pre-war look does not resemble the flapper style, their independence may have led to the flapper wisecracking tenacity 30 years later.

Writers in the United States such as F. Scott Fitzgerald and Anita Loos and illustrators such as Russell Patterson, John Held, Jr., Ethel Hays and Faith Burrows popularized the flapper look and lifestyle through their works, and flappers came to be seen as attractive, reckless, and independent. Among those who criticized the flapper craze was writer-critic Dorothy Parker, who penned "Flappers: A Hate Song" to poke fun at the fad. The secretary of labor denounced the "flippancy of the cigarette smoking, cocktail-drinking flapper". A Harvard psychologist reported that flappers had "the lowest degree of intelligence" and constituted "a hopeless problem for educators".

Another writer, Lynne Frame, said in her book that a large number of scientists and health professionals have analyzed and reviewed the degree of femininity of flappers' appearance and behavior, given the "boyishness" of the flapper look and behavior. Some gynecologists gave the opinion that women were less "marriageable" if they were less "feminine", as the husband would be unhappy in his marriage. In Frame's book, she also wrote that the appearance of flappers, like the short hair and short dress, distracted attention from feminine curves to the legs and body. These attributes were not only a fashion trend but also the expression of a blurring of gender roles.

The Gibson Girl
The Gibson Girl was one of the origins of the flapper. The invention of Charles Dana Gibson, the Gibson Girl changed the fashion, patterns, and lifestyles of the 1920s; these were much more progressive than the traditions of women's styles in the past. Before the Gibson Girl movement, women's voices as a group were infrequently heard. While some may see the Gibson Girl as just a fashion statement, it was much more broadly influential than that. "She depicted the modern woman, known popularly as the 'new woman', at a time when more women gained independence, began to work outside the home, and sought the right to vote and other rights." Gibson's illustrations showed feminist women of all kinds who worried more about themselves than about pleasing the men in their lives. It was the first time a woman could actually concentrate on her own dreams and goals. The Gibson Girl also exemplified the importance of intelligence and learning rather than catering to men's needs.

According to a website on Kate Chopin, "The Gibson Girl influenced society in the early 1900s much like Barbie influenced society of the late 1900s. The Gibson Girl crossed many societal lines opening the way for women to participate in things they had never done before. She, like Barbie, portrayed women as strong individuals who could play sports while maintaining perfectly coiffed hair and dress. She was criticized by many, much like Barbie, for creating an unrealistic ideal of what women should look like: perfect proportions and long flowing hair. Despite the criticism she was a trend setter, a model for women in both dress and action, just like Barbie."

The fashion of the Gibson Girl allowed women a much more active lifestyle than previously, in both work and recreation. "Skirts were long and flared, and dresses were tailored with high necks and close-fitting sleeves. The style was considered masculine, and this was sometimes emphasized by wearing a necktie. Though women still wore the restrictive undergarments known as corsets, a new health corset came into style that was said to be better for the spine than earlier corsets. An S-shaped figure became trendy, with a large bust and large hips, separated by a tiny, corseted waist. These styles [were] worn with confidence and poise by modern women. ... She might be pictured at a desk in a tailored shirtwaist or at a tennis party in an informal sports dress. She wore her long hair upswept in an elaborate mass of curls, perhaps topped by a simple straw hat. Though she was capable and independent, the Gibson girl was always beautiful and elegant." According to the Library of Congress, "Gibson's meticulous depiction of their hats accentuates the Gibson Girls' stylish attire and visually reinforces the impression of height, leading the eye to the mountains. ... Gibson shows off the classic Gibson Girl as a figure who embraced outdoor physical activities."

The Gibson Girl was uniquely American compared to European standards of style. She was an ideal: youthful, feminist, strong and a truly modern woman. Gibson emphasized that any women can be represented as a Gibson Girl, both those in the middle and the upper class. Minnie Clark, known as "the original Gibson Girl", was a model for Gibson and could portray any type of women needed for his illustration. Gibson drew with characteristic grace women of all races and classes so that any woman could feel that they, too, could be a graceful Gibson girl.

Magazines

In 1922, a small-circulation magazine – The Flapper, located in Chicago – celebrated the flapper's appeal. On the opening page of its first issue, it proudly declared flappers' break with traditional values. Also, flappers defended them by contrasting themselves with earlier generations of women whom they called "clinging vines". They mocked the confining fashions and demure passivity of older women and reveled in their own freedom. They did not even acknowledge that the previous generation of female activists had made the flappers' freedom possible.

In 1923, the flapper magazine Experience included an article on police reform, possibly indicating a concern for societal issues.

In the 1920s, new magazines appealed to young German women with a sensuous image and advertisements for the appropriate clothes and accessories they would want to purchase. The glossy pages of Die Dame and Das Blatt der Hausfrau displayed the "Girl"—the flapper. She was young and fashionable, financially independent, and was an eager consumer of the latest fashions. The magazines kept her up to date on fashion, arts, sports, and modern technology such as automobiles and telephones.

Behavior
Although many young women in the 1920s saw flappers as the symbol of a brighter future, some also questioned the flappers' more extreme behavior. Therefore, in 1923, the magazine began asking for true stories from its readers for a new column called "Confessions of a Flapper". Some of these were lighthearted stories of girls getting the better of those who underestimated them, but others described girls betraying their own standards of behavior in order to live up to the image of flappers. There were several examples: a newlywed confessed to having cheated on her husband, a college student described being told by a boyfriend that she was not "the marrying kind" because of the sexual liberties she had permitted him, and a minister's daughter recounted the humiliation of being caught in the lie of pretending she was older and more sophisticated than she was. Many readers thought that flappers had gone too far in their quest for adventure. One 23-year-old "ex-vamp" declared: "In my opinion, the average flappers from 15 to 19 were brainless, inconsiderate of others, and easy to get into serious trouble."

So, among the readers of The Flapper, parts of them were celebrated for flappers' spirit and appropriation of male privilege, while parts of them acknowledged the dangers of emulating flappers too faithfully, with some even confessing to violating their own codes of ethics so as to live up to all the hype.

American banks and "flapper" employees
According to a report in 1922, some banks across the United States started to regulate the dress and deportment of young female employees who were considered to be "flappers". It began with a complaint of a mother in New Jersey who felt dissatisfied because her son did business only with a young female employee, whom she considered illegally attractive. The incident was duly reported to the officials of the bank, and rules adopted regarding requirements in dress for female employees. Those rules included that the dress should not have a pattern, it should be bought from a specific store, it must be worn in either black, blue or brown, its sleeves must not be shortened above the elbow, and its hem must not be worn higher than 12 inches from the ground. After that, the anti-flapper code soon spread to the Federal Reserve, where female employees were firmly told that there was no time for them to beautify themselves during office hours.

Image of youth 

The flapper stands as one of the more enduring images of youth and new women in the 20th century and is viewed by modern-day Americans as something of a cultural heroine. However, back in the 1920s, many Americans regarded flappers as threatening to conventional society, representing a new moral order. Although most of them were the daughters of the middle class, they flouted middle-class values. Lots of women in the United States were drawn to the idea of being a flapper. There were rival organizations of flappers – the National Flapper Flock and the Royal Order of the Flapper. Flappers shrugged off their chaperones, danced suggestively, and openly flirted with boys. "Flappers prized style over substance, novelty over tradition, and pleasure over virtue." Ruth Gillettes, a 1920s singer, had a song titled "Oh Say! Can I See You Tonight?" which expresses the new behavior of girls in the 1920s. Before the 1920s, for a woman to call a man to suggest a date would be impossible. However, in the 1920s, many girls seemed to play a leading role in relationships, actively asking boys out or even coming to their homes.

Flappers' behavior was considered outlandish at the time and redefined women's roles. In the English media, they were stereotyped as pleasure-loving, reckless and prone to defying convention by initiating sexual relationships. Some have suggested that the flapper concept as a stage of life particular to young women was imported to England from Germany, where it originated "as a sexual reaction against the over-fed, under-exercised monumental woman, and as a compromise between pederasty and normal sex". In Germany, teenage girls were called "Backfisch", which meant a young fish not yet big enough to be sold in the market. Although the concept of "Backfisch" was known in England by the late 1880s, the term was understood to mean a very demure social type unlike the flapper, who was typically rebellious and defiant of convention. The evolving image of flappers was of independent young women who went by night to jazz clubs such as those in Harlem, which were viewed as erotic and dangerous, where they danced provocatively, smoked cigarettes and dated freely, perhaps indiscriminately. They were active, sporting, rode bicycles, drove cars, and openly drank alcohol, a defiant act in the American period of Prohibition. With time, came the development of dance styles such as the Charleston, the Shimmy, the Bunny Hug, and the Black Bottom, which were considered shocking, but were a symbolic badge of the flapper's rejection of traditional standards.

Overturning of Victorian roles 

Flappers also began working outside the home and challenging women's traditional societal roles and the monolithic historical idea of women being powerless throughout social history.

They were considered a significant challenge to traditional Victorian gender roles, devotion to plain-living, hard work and religion. Increasingly, women discarded old, rigid ideas about roles and embraced consumerism and personal choice, and were often described in terms of representing a "culture war" of old versus new. Flappers also advocated voting and women's rights.

In this manner, flappers were a result of larger social changes – women were able to vote in the United States in 1920, and religious society had been rocked by the Scopes trial.

For all the concern about women stepping out of their traditional roles, however, many flappers were not engaged in politics. In fact, older suffragettes, who fought for the right for women to vote, viewed flappers as vapid and in some ways unworthy of the enfranchisement they had worked so hard to win. Dorothy Dunbar Bromley, a noted liberal writer at the time, summed up this dichotomy by describing flappers as "truly modern", "New Style" feminists who "admit that a full life calls for marriage and children" and also "are moved by an inescapable inner compulsion to be individuals in their own right".

Petting parties 
"Petting" ("making out" or foreplay) became more common than in the Victorian era, for example, with the rise in popularity of "petting parties". At these parties, promiscuity became more commonplace, breaking from the traditions of monogamy or courtship with their expectations of eventual marriage. This was typical on college campuses, where young people "spent a great deal of unsupervised time in mixed company".

Carolyn Van Wyck wrote a column for Photoplay, an upmarket magazine that featured articles on pop culture, advice on fashion, and even articles on helping readers channel their inner celebrity. In March 1926, an anonymous young woman wrote in describing petting as a problem, explaining, "The boys all seem to do it and don't seem to come back if you don't do it also. We girls are at our wits' end to know what to do. ... I'm sure that I don't want to marry anyone who is too slow to want to pet. But I want to discover what is right. Please help me." Van Wyck sympathized with the problem the writer faced and added, "It seems to me much better to be known as a flat tire and keep romance in one's mind than to be called a hot date and have fear in one's heart."

In the 1950s, Life magazine depicted petting parties as "that famed and shocking institution of the '20s", and, commenting on the 'Kinsey Report', said that they have been "very much with us ever since". In the Kinsey Report of 1950, there was an indicated increase in premarital intercourse for the generation of the 1920s. Kinsey found that of women born before 1900, 14 percent acknowledged premarital sex before the age of 25, while those born after 1900 were two and a half times more likely (36 percent) to have premarital intercourse and experience an orgasm.

Slang 
Flappers were associated with the use of a number of slang words, including "junk", "necker", "heavy petting", and "necking parties", although these words existed before the 1920s. Flappers also used the word "jazz" in the sense of anything exciting or fun. Their language sometimes reflected their feelings about dating, marriage and drinking habits: "I have to see a man about a dog" at this period often meant going to buy whiskey, and a "handcuff" or "manacle" was an engagement or wedding ring. Moreover, flappers invented slang terms like "hush money", which meant the allowance from a father or "dropping the pilot", which meant getting a divorce. Also reflective of their preoccupations were phrases to express approval, such as "That's so Jake" (okay), "She/he's the bee's knees" (a superb person), "Cake-eater" (a ladies' man), and the popular "the cat's meow" (anything wonderful).

There were two more slang terms that reflected flappers' behaviors or lifestyles, which were "treating" and "charity girls". "Treating" was a culture or habit mainly for the working-class flappers. Although they earned money from work, they still wanted to earn some more for them to live. Women were willingly invited to dance, for drinks, for entrances up to jewelry and clothing. For the "return service", women granted any kind of erotic or sexual interaction from flirting to sexual intercourse. However, this practice was easily mistaken for prostitution. So, some people would call them "charity girls" to differentiate them from prostitutes, as the girls claimed that they did not accept money in their sexual encounters with men.

Appearance 

In addition to their irreverent behavior, flappers were known for their style, which largely emerged as a result of French fashions, especially those pioneered by Coco Chanel, the effect on dress of the rapid spread of American jazz, and the popularization of dancing that accompanied it. Called garçonne in French ("boy" with a feminine suffix), flapper style made girls look young and boyish: short hair, flattened breasts, and straight waists accentuated it. By at least 1913, the association between slim adolescence and a certain characteristic look became fixed in the public's mind. Lillian Nordica, commenting on New York fashions that year, referred to

At this early date, it seems that the style associated with a flapper already included the boyish physique and close-fitting hat, but a hobble skirt rather than one with a high hemline.

Although the appearance typically associated now with flappers (straight waists, short hair and a hemline above the knee) did not fully emerge until 1926, there was an early association in the public mind between unconventional appearance, outrageous behavior, and the word "flapper". A report in The Times of a 1915 Christmas entertainment for troops stationed in France described a soldier in drag burlesquing feminine flirtatiousness while wearing "short skirts, a hat of Parisian type and flapper-like hair".

Despite the scandal flappers generated, their look became fashionable in a toned-down form among respectable older women. Significantly, the flappers removed the corset from female fashion, raised skirt and gown hemlines, and popularized short hair for women. Among actresses closely identified with the style were Tallulah Bankhead, Olive Borden, Clara Bow, Louise Brooks, Joan Crawford, Bebe Daniels, Billie Dove, Leatrice Joy, Helen Kane, Laura La Plante, Dorothy Mackaill, Colleen Moore, Norma Shearer, Norma Talmadge, Olive Thomas, and Alice White.

Beginning in the early 1920s, flappers began appearing in newspaper comic strips; Blondie Boopadoop and Fritzi Ritz – later depicted more domestically, as the wife of Dagwood Bumstead and aunt of Nancy, respectively – were introduced as flappers.

Apparel 

Flapper dresses were straight and loose, leaving the arms bare (sometimes no straps at all) and dropping the waistline to the hips. Silk or rayon stockings were held up by garters. Skirts rose to just below the knee by 1927, allowing flashes of leg to be seen when a girl danced or walked through a breeze, although the way they danced made any long loose skirt flap up to show their legs. To enhance the view, some flappers applied rouge to their knees. Popular dress styles included the robe de style. High heels also came into vogue at the time, reaching 2–3 inches (5–8 cm) high. Favored shoe styles were Mary Janes and T-straps in classic black, gold, silver, or nude shades.

Lingerie 
Flappers did away with corsets and pantaloons in favor of "step-in" panties. Without the old restrictive corsets, flappers wore simple bust bodices to restrain their chest when dancing. They also wore new, softer and suppler corsets that reached to their hips, smoothing the whole frame, giving women a straight up and down appearance as opposed to the old corsets that slenderized the waist and accented the hips and bust.

The lack of curves of a corset promoted a boyish look. Adding an even more boyish look, the Symington Side Lacer was invented and became a popular essential as an everyday bra. This type of bra was made to pull in the back to flatten the chest. Other women envied flappers for their flat chests and bought the Symington Side Lacer to enhance the same look; large breasts were commonly regarded as a trait of unsophistication. Hence, flat chests became appealing to women, although flappers were the most common to wear such bras.

Hair and accessories 

Boyish cuts were in vogue and released the weight of the tradition of women being required to grow their hair long, through popular cuts such as the bob cut, Eton crop, and shingle bob. Finger waving was used as a means of styling. Hats were still required wear, and popular styles included the newsboy cap and cloche hat.

Jewelry usually consisted of art deco pieces, especially many layers of beaded necklaces. Pins, rings, and brooches came into style. Horn-rimmed glasses were also popular.

Cosmetics 

As far back as the 1890s, French actress Polaire pioneered a look which included short, disheveled hair, emphatic mouth and huge eyes heavily outlined in kohl. The evolving flapper look required "heavy makeup" in comparison to what had previously been acceptable outside of professional usage in the theater. With the invention of the metal lipstick container as well as compact mirrors, bee-stung lips came into vogue. Dark eyes, especially kohl-rimmed, were the style. Blush came into vogue now that it was no longer a messy application process. Women shaped their eyebrows needle-thin and penciled them in dark, emulating such actresses as Clara Bow.

Originally, pale skin was considered most attractive. However, tanned skin became increasingly popular after Coco Chanel showed off a tan after a holiday – it suggested a life of leisure, without the onerous need to work. Women wanted to look fit, sporty, and, above all, healthy.

Semiotics of the flapper 

Being liberated from restrictive dress, from laces that interfered with breathing, and from hoops that needed managing suggested liberation of another sort. The new-found freedom to breathe and walk encouraged movement out of the house, and the flapper took full advantage. The flapper was an extreme manifestation of changes in the lifestyles of American women made visible through dress.

Changes in fashion were interpreted as signs of deeper changes in the American feminine ideal. The short skirt and bobbed hair were likely to be used as a symbol of emancipation. Signs of the moral revolution consisted of premarital sex, birth control, drinking, and contempt for older values. Before the War, a lady did not set foot in a saloon; after the War, a woman, though no more "a lady", entered a speakeasy as casually as she would go into a railroad station. Women had started swearing and smoking publicly, using contraceptives, raising their skirts above the knee and rolling their hose below it. Women were now competing with men in the business world and obtaining financial independence and, therefore, other kinds of independence from men.

The New Woman was pushing the boundaries of gender roles, representing sexual and economic freedom. She cut her hair short and took to loose-fitting clothing and low cut dresses. No longer restrained by a tight waist and long trailing skirts, the modern woman of the 1920s was an independent thinker, who no longer followed the conventions of those before her. The flapper was an example of the prevailing conceptions of women and their roles during the Roaring 1920s. The flappers' ideal was motion with characteristics of intensity, energy, and volatility. She refused the traditional moral code. Modesty, chastity, morality, and traditional concepts of masculinity and femininity were seemingly ignored. The flapper was making an appeal to authority and was being attached to the impending "demoralization" of the country.

The Victorian American conception of sexuality and other roles of men and women in society and to one another were being challenged. Modern clothing was lighter and more flexible, better suiting the modern woman such as the flapper who wanted to engage in active sport. Women were now becoming more assertive and less willing to keep the home fires burning. The flappers' costume was seen as sexual and raised deeper questions of the behavior and values it symbolized.

End of the flapper era 

The flapper lifestyle and look disappeared and the roaring '20s era of glitz and glamour came to an end in America after the Wall Street Crash of 1929
Unable to afford the latest trends and lifestyle, the once-vibrant flapper women returned to their dropped hemlines, and the flapper dress disappeared. A sudden serious tone washed over the public with the appearance of the Great Depression. The high-spirited attitude and hedonism were less acceptable during the economic hardships of the 1930s. When hemlines began to rise again, numerous states took action, making laws that restricted women to wear skirts with hemlines no shorter than three inches (7.5 centimeters) above the ankle. The ever-popular bobbed haircut was the cause for some women being fired from their jobs.

Transitioning into the 1930s was no easy task. Campaigns such as the "Make Do and Mend" slogan were becoming prevalent to ensure there was no overconsumption throughout society.
Fabric choices were among the many items to be cut back during this poverty-stricken time. Artificial fabrics were used instead of elegant fabrics such as silk, which were so popular in the early 1900s. No longer were party dresses adorned with decorative embellishments or made brightly colored. Instead, women headed to work to take over roles of men at war. The physically demanding jobs called for the creation and social acceptance of women's pants in society.

See also 

 Betty Boop
 Hawksian woman
 Generation gap
 Interbellum Generation
 Jazz Age
 Lost Generation

 Modern girl
 Thoroughly Modern Millie, 1962 film and 2002 stage musical
 1929 United Kingdom general election, "the flapper election"
 Youth Culture
 Zelda Fitzgerald

References 
Informational notes

Citations

Bibliography
 Abra, Allison. (September 2016) "Going to the palais: a social and cultural history of dancing and dance halls in Britain, 1918–1960." Contemporary British History 30#3 pp. 432–433.
 .
 .
 Dumenil, Lynn (1995) The Modern Temper: American Culture and Society in the 1920s. New York: Hill and Wang. 
 Fass, Paula S. (2007) The Damned and the Beautiful: American Youth in the 1920s. 2007. 
 Gourley, Kathleen (2007) Flappers and the New American Woman: Perceptions of Women from 1918 Through the 1920s (Images and or of Women in the Twentieth Century). 
 Hudovernik, Robert (2006) Jazz Age Beauties: The Lost Collection of Ziegfeld Photographer Alfred Cheney Johnston. 
 Latham, Angela J. (2000) Posing a Threat: Flappers, Chorus Girls, and other Brazen Performers of the American 1920s. 
 Lauber, Ellie (2000) Fashions of the Roaring '20s. 
 Sagert, Kelly Boyer. Flappers: A Guide to an American Subculture. Santa Barbara, CA:   Greenwood Press, 2010. 
 
 

Further reading
 Mackrell, Judith (2014) Flappers: Six Women of a Dangerous Generation.  Clerkenwell, London, England: Pan MacMillan  (Diana Cooper, Nancy Cunard, Tallulah Bankhead, Zelda Fitzgerald, Josephine Baker, Tamara de Lempicka)

External links 

 .
 .
 
 .

 
Slang
1920s fashion
Fashion aesthetics
Gender equality
1920s slang
Slang terms for women
Stereotypes of women
Subcultures